Rumeysa Gelgi (born 1 January 1997) is a Turkish advocate, researcher and front-end developer, who holds the titles of tallest living woman, largest hands (female), longest fingers (female), longest back (female) and previously held the title of tallest living female teenager by Guinness World Records.

Gelgi lives in the Karabük province of Turkey. Her height is caused by Weaver syndrome, a rare condition which causes rapid growth among other abnormalities.  It affects men three times more than women. Because of her condition, she usually uses a wheelchair to move, but can walk for short periods of time with a walker. Due to her condition, she cannot sit in seats under 50–55 cm.

Gelgi says that she wishes to use her title to raise awareness of diseases and conditions such as hers.

On November 8, 2022, Gelgi was able to fly on an airplane for the first time in her life. Turkish Airlines had to remove six chair rows from one of their planes to make her trip from Istanbul to San Francisco, California, U.S. a possibility. The event got media attention.

See also 
 Sultan Kösen, the world's tallest living person (also from Turkey)
 Zeng Jinlian, the tallest woman ever to live

References 

Turkish women
Living people
1997 births
Guinness World Records
World record holders